The following is a list of Tennessee State Tigers football seasons for the football team that has represented Tennessee State University in NCAA competition.

Seasons

References 

 
Lists of college football seasons
Tennessee State Tigers football seasons